Blåmanen is one of the seven mountains that surround the centre of the city of Bergen in Vestland county, Norway. The mountain Rundemanen lies just north of Blåmanen.

See also
List of mountains of Norway

References

Mountains of Bergen